Local elections were held in Pasay on May 9, 2016 within the Philippine general election. The voters elected for the elective local posts in the city: the mayor, vice mayor, the congressman, and the councilors, six of them in the two districts of the city.

Background
Mayor Antonino “Tony” Calixto ran for third consecutive term under Liberal Party. His opponents were former Congressman Dr. Jose Antonio “Lito” Roxas, businessman Jorge Del Rosario, and independent candidates Romulo Marcelo, Pastor de Castro, and Albert Bañez. Former Rep. Jose Antonio "Lito" Roxas' namesake, independent candidate Joselito "Lito" Roxas, who also bear the same name of his in the ballot, also ran.

Vice Mayor Marlon Pesebre sought third and final term, and ran under the United Nationalist Alliance. His opponent is Pasay's BPLO Sec. Boyet Del Rosario.

Incumbent Rep. Imelda Calixto-Rubiano of the Liberal Party is running for her third consecutive term. Her opponents were former Acting City Administrator Atty. Santiago "Sonny" Quial of the Nationalist People's Coalition, Jose Allan Tebelin, and Deo Laguipo.

The Major Coalitions was Team Dr. Roxas is a major opposition team, which is composed of Nationalist People's Coalition, United Nationalist Alliance, Partido Demokratikong Pilipino-Lakas ng Bayan, Pwersa ng Masang Pilipino and Akbayan. Team Calixto is the administration coalition of Pasay under Liberal Party.

Candidates

Administration's Ticket

Team Calixto

Opposition's Ticket

Team Roxas

Team Pagasa

Results 
Names written in bold-Italic are the re-elected incumbents while in italic are incumbents lost in elections.

For Representative
Rep. Imelda Calixto-Rubiano defeated former Acting City Administrator Santiago "Sonny" Quial, Jose Allan "Bong" Tebelin, and Deo Laguipo.

For Mayor
Mayor Antonino "Tony" Calixto defeated his closest rival former Rep. Jose Antonio “Lito” Roxas.

For Vice Mayor
Vice Mayor Marlon Pesebre was defeated by BPLO Sec. Noel "Boyet" Del Rosario.

For Councilors

First District
Only Alberto Alvina was the incumbent who was re-elected. 

Mark Anthony Calixto, son of Mayor Antonino "Tony" Calixto was elected for the first time. 

Jerome Advincula, son of term-limited councilor Richard Advincula, successfully replaced his father.

Former Liga President and former Councilor Ma. Antonia Cuneta, daughter-in-law of former Mayor Pablo Cuneta and wife of former ex-officio councilor Generoso Cuneta, successfully made a comeback in city council. 

Ricardo "Ding" Santos, who is a former mayoral and vice mayoral candidate in several previous elections ,and the former security aide of former Mayor Pablo Cuneta, was elected as one of the newly-posted councilor of the district. 

Consertino "Tino" Santos replaced his wife, three-termer councilor Mary Grace Santos. 

Councilor Jennifer Roxas, wife of mayoral candidate and former Rep. Jose Antonio "Lito" Roxas, failed to secured her seat in the city council, placing 7th.

Former Councilor Ma. Luisa "Bing" Petallo failed to made city council comeback. Nelfa Trinidad, former City First Lady and wife of former Mayor Wenceslao Trinidad ran and lost, placing 12th.

|-bgcolor=black
|colspan=5|

Second District
Three of the six councilors were re-elected, except Arvin "Bong" Tolentino who lost and placed 7th. Three-termer councilor Ian Vendivel was replaced by his wife, Donnabel Vendivel. The newly-elected councilors of the district were Edith "Wowee" Manguerra, and Jose "Joey" Isidro Jr. Isidro, who was the nephew of siblings Rep.Imelda "Emi" Calixto-Rubiano and Mayor Antonino "Tony" Calixto.

Other former councilors who failed to made city council comeback were Ileana Ibay and Noel "Onie" Bayona.

|-bgcolor=black 
|colspan=5|

References

2016 Philippine local elections
Elections in Pasay
2016 elections in Metro Manila